Aminocyclopyrachlor is a selective, low-toxicity herbicide that provides pre- and post-emergent control of broadleaf weeds, woody species, vines and grasses on several non-food use sites, such as rights of way, wildlife management areas, recreational areas, turf/lawns, golf courses and sod farms.  It was conditionally registered as Imprelis by DuPont in August 2010, and first used in Fall 2010.  The chemical is a systemic herbicide and acts by disrupting gene expression.  This causes undifferentiated cell division and elongation.

Due to the possibility of damage to specific conifer species, the United States Environmental Protection Agency and DuPont advised professional applicators and residential consumers to not use Imprelis where Norway spruce or white pine trees are present on or near the property being treated.

The impacts of aminocyclopyrachlor on garden plants, when found as a residue in mulch is commonly reported. It is a highly toxic Persistent Herbicide that will kill a tomato plant at a concentration of one part per billion, and impact many other garden plants also. And is often used as a herbicide for hay and straw producers, which makes it increasingly likely that horse manure and bedding will be contaminated with it.

Persistent herbicides are a narrow range of herbicides used to kill broad leaf weeds and thistle that compete with grasses and grain crops. They are "persistent" because they will not decompose under the high temperatures in thermophilic composting and may take over 2 years or more to fully decay.

There are 4 persistent herbicides:

Picloram - Sold as Graslan™, Grazon®, Surmount®, and Tordon®
Clopyralid - Sold as Stinger®
Aminopyralid - Sold as Capstone™, Chaparral™, CleanWave®, Forefront®, GrazonNext®, Milestone®, Opensight®, PasturAll®, and Sendero.™
Aminocyclopyrachlor - Sold as Imprelis®
These herbicides are extremely potent, with maximum application rates of only 7-12 liquid ounces....per acre.......per year.

References 

Herbicides
Pyrimidines
Carboxylic acids
Chloroarenes
Cyclopropanes
Auxinic herbicides